Boston Bolts is an American soccer club based in Newton, Massachusetts. The club's men's team plays in USL League Two, using Alumni Field at Mount Ida College, with capacity of 2,000, as their home field.

In 2021, the Boston Bolts finished the season 2nd in the Northeast Division of USL2 and qualified for the playoffs.

Club history
The Boston Bolts started with four girls teams in 1986. Now the oldest soccer club in Massachusetts, the Bolts attracted the finest coaches and players in the Boston area, and rapidly grew to a coed club of national recognition. In 1994, the girls U19 Bolts captured the USYSA National Championship title, becoming the first and only girls team from Massachusetts to win the prestigious national title. In 2005, the boys U15 Bolts became the first and only Massachusetts boys team to win the title. In its tenure, Bolts teams have earned a spot of national prominence winning more state, regional and national cup competitions, and also other national and international showcase tournaments such as Score at the Shore, the Disney Showcase, Dallas Cup and Surf Cup, than any other Massachusetts team.

The club has been led by a series of recognized soccer figures, such as John Burrill, past Executive Director of Mass Youth Soccer; Ed Kelly, Head Men’s Coach at Boston College; John Kerr, Head Men’s Coach at Duke University; John Willet, former President; and current CEO, Brian Ainscough.

Players

Notable former players

This list of notable former players comprises players who went on to play professional soccer after playing for the team in the Premier Development League, USL2, or those who previously played professionally before joining the team.

  Josh Bauer
  Younes Boudadi
  Shalrie Joseph
  Justin Rennicks
  Miles Robinson
  Mac Steeves
  Harry Swartz
  Oliver White

Year-by-year

References

External links
 
 Boston Bolts at USL League Two

2015 establishments in Massachusetts
Association football clubs established in 2015
Newton, Massachusetts
Soccer clubs in Massachusetts
Sports in Middlesex County, Massachusetts
USL League Two teams